Dawes Creek is a stream in the U.S. state of Wisconsin. It is a tributary to Hemlock Creek.

Dawes Creek most likely has the name of the local Dawes family, the first member of which arrived to Wood County in 1850.

References

Rivers of Wood County, Wisconsin
Rivers of Wisconsin